Nnamdi Azikiwe Library is located on the campus of University of Nigeria, Nsukka. Established in 1960, it is named after the first president of Nigeria, Nnamdi Azikiwe. 

The library houses archival collections. Users access this collection through the library catalogue or shelf browsing. The library has a Facebook page.

History
The library collection grew steadily between 1964 and 1967, increasing annually by 20,000 volumes. It was among the few academic libraries in Nigeria to apply ICT components in the 1970s, beginning to automate its serial records in 1975. On 8 March 2009, the library moved to a much larger building whose construction began in 1982.

References 

University of Nigeria
Academic libraries in Nigeria